Lysimelia is a genus of moths of the family Noctuidae. The genus was erected by Francis Walker in 1859.

Species
Lysimelia alborenalis Roepke, 1938 Sulawesi
Lysimelia alstoni Holloway, 1979 Sri Lanka
Lysimelia kona (C. Swinhoe, 1902) Peninsular Malaysia, Borneo
Lysimelia lenis (T. P. Lucas, 1898) New Caledonia, Queensland
Lysimelia lysimeloides (Hampson, 1893) Sri Lanka
Lysimelia neleusalis Walker, [1859] Oriental Tropics - Sumatra, Borneo
Lysimelia nigripes (Hampson, 1895) Sikkim, Myanmar
Lysimelia ochreipes Prout, 1932 Sumatra, Peninsular Malaysia, Borneo
Lysimelia phineusalis (Walker, [1859]) Peninsular Malaysia, Borneo, Natuna Islands
Lysimelia silvialis (Walker, [1859]) Borneo, Peninsular Malaysia, Sumatra, Bali

References

Herminiinae
Moth genera